Eddie McCloskey (born 1988 in Loughguile, County Antrim) is a sportsperson from Northern Ireland. He plays hurling with his local club Loughgiel Shamrocks and has been a member of the Antrim senior inter-county team since 2007 until 2011

References

Team

1988 births
Living people
Loughgiel Shamrocks hurlers
Antrim inter-county hurlers
Ulster inter-provincial hurlers